Calliotropis dentata is a species of sea snail, a marine gastropod mollusk in the family Eucyclidae.

Description
The height of the shell attains 9.5 mm.

Distribution
This marine species is found off Venezuela.

References

External links
 To Biodiversity Heritage Library (1 publication)
 To Encyclopedia of Life
 To USNM Invertebrate Zoology Mollusca Collection
 To World Register of Marine Species

dentata
Gastropods described in 1991